Albara is a genus of moths belonging to the subfamily Drepaninae. The genus has an Asian distribution, with Albara reversaria occurring in India, Indonesia, China and Taiwan, and Albara hollowayi known from Indonesia and peninsular Malaysia.

Species
Albara reversaria Walker, 1866
Albara hollowayi Watson, 1970

Former species
Albara flava (Moore, 1879), now Tridrepana flava (Moore, 1879)

References

Drepaninae
Drepanidae genera